Neville Maxwell (born 15 May 1970) is an Irish rower. He competed at the 1996 Summer Olympics and the 2000 Summer Olympics. Maxwell attended St Joseph's Patrician College.

References

External links
 

1970 births
Living people
Alumni of the University of Galway
Irish male rowers
Olympic rowers of Ireland
People educated at St Joseph's Patrician College
Rowers at the 1996 Summer Olympics
Rowers at the 2000 Summer Olympics
Sportspeople from County Galway